Tit Štante (born 11 October 1998) is a Slovenian snowboarder. He competed in the 2018 Winter Olympics.

References

1998 births
Living people
Sportspeople from Celje
Snowboarders at the 2018 Winter Olympics
Snowboarders at the 2022 Winter Olympics
Slovenian male snowboarders
Olympic snowboarders of Slovenia
Snowboarders at the 2016 Winter Youth Olympics